Roland Aircraft is a German aircraft manufacturer based in Mendig. The company is owned by Roland Hauke and specializes in the manufacture of all-metal aircraft, made from aluminium sheet.

While known for its Roland Me 109 Replica, the company also builds the Roland S-STOL two seat STOL design and the Roland Z-120 Relax, a single-seat high-wing design for the German 120 kg class.

Aircraft

References

External links

 
Aircraft manufacturers of Germany